was a Japanese actor. He is most famous for playing villains and appeared in many jidaigeki and detective television dramas as a guest. Uchida graduated from Aoyama Gakuin University. In1968, he joined Yukio Mishima's Roman Gekijo Theatre Company.  Uchida made 68 appearances as a guest on Mito Kōmon. (It was mostly as a guest. )

On January 31, 2020, at 4:33 p.m., Uchida died of liver cancer.

Filmography

Film
 Sukeban (1971) - Mikami
 Sex & Fury (1973) - Gentarô Kanô
 Boso sekkusu-zoku (1973)
 Sukeban: Taiman Shobu (1974) - Isozaki
 ESPY (1974) - Gorou Tatsumati
 Wakai kizoku-tachi: 13-kaidan no Maki (1975) - Nina Nakaoka
 Terror of Mechagodzilla (1975) - Interpol Agent Jiro Murakoshi
 Champion of Death (1975)
 Karate Bearfighter (1975)
 Hatsukoi (1975) - Agawa
 Andô Noboru no waga tôbô to sex no kiroku (1976) - Hideo Shindo
 Never Give Up (1978)
 G.I. Samurai (1979) - Asaba Yorichika
 Ninja bugeicho momochi sandayu (1980) - Shiranui Gennosuke
 Shogun's Ninja (1983)
 Ebarake no hitobito (1991)
 Senso e iko yo!! (1994)
 Senso e iko yo!! 2 (1994)
 Samurai Marathon (2019)

Television drama
 Hissatsu Shiokinin (1972, episode 4, Guest starring)
 Taiyō ni Hoero! (1973-1985, episode 39, 61, 223, 411, 638, Guest starring)
 Mito Kōmon (1973-2011, 68 appearances) - Guest
 Tasukenin Hashiru (1974, episode 4, 17, 33, Guest starring)
 Katsu Kaishū (1974) - Imuda Shōhei
 Hissatsu Shiokiya Kagyō (1975, episode 21, Guest starring)
 G-Men '75 (1977–1981, episode 118, 160, 201, 256, 307, Guest starring)
 Shin Hissatsu Shiokinin (1977, episode 21, Guest starring)
 Hissatsu Karakurinin Fugakuhiyakkei Koroshitabi (1978, episode 4 Guest starring)
 Abarenbō Shōgun (1978–2002, 28 appearances) - Guest
 Seibu Keisatsu (1981-84, 6 appearances))
 Akō Rōshi (1979) - Izawa shinnosuke
 Tokugawa Ieyasu (1983) - Yasumasa Sakakibara
 Nobunaga King of Zipangu  (1992) - Asayama Nichijo

References

External links

Japanese male film actors
Actors from Chiba Prefecture
20th-century Japanese male actors
1944 births
2020 deaths